Świbie  (German: Schwieben) is a village in the administrative district of Gmina Wielowieś, within Gliwice County, Silesian Voivodeship, in southern Poland.

The village has a population of 1,198.

See also
Peter Kiołbassa (1837-1905) Polonia activist and Democratic politician in the City of Chicago who helped organize Chicago's first Roman Catholic parish was born in Świbie

References

Villages in Gliwice County